The 2012 season was the tenth for the  Specialized–lululemon cycling team, which began as the T-Mobile team in 2003. After the men's team HTC–Highroad stopped, Kristy Scrymgeour convinced manufacturer Specialized and sports apparel company Lululemon Athletica to perpetuate the women's team in this Olympic year. The team changed slightly: Clara Hughes and Trixi Worrack were the main new recruits, while Judith Arndt, team leader since 2006, joined GreenEdge–AIS. The team had a great year. Ina-Yoko Teutenberg won numerous sprints and finished fourth in the road race of the Olympic Games. Evelyn Stevens had an excellent season by winning at the world cup race La Flèche Wallonne Féminine, she won a prestigious stage of the Giro d'Italia Femminile and finished on the podium in the end and she won the general classification of the La Route de France. At the end of the season she was in fourth place in the UCI World Ranking. Ellen van Dijk won the general classification of the Lotto–Decca Tour, the Omloop van Borsele and several stage races. The team dominated especially in the team time trials. Ellen van Dijk together with Stevens, Hughes, Amber Neben and Trixi Worrack or Teutenberg were consistent and undefeated the whole year. At the end of the season the team won the first team time trial at the world championship which was a main goal for the team this year. The team finished second in the UCI World Ranking.

Roster

Ages as of 1 January 2012. 

Source

Riders who joined the team for the 2012 season

Riders who left the team during or after the 2011 season

Season

January – February
As part of the national selection Chloe Hosking and Loren Rowney started the year with success in the Jayco Bay Series in Australia in January.

The team started the season in early February in the Ladies Tour of Qatar, where Trixi Worrack finished second in the general classification after winning the second stage. Loren Rowney, riding for the American national team, won the second stage of the Women's Tour of New Zealand. Evelyn Stevens, also riding for the American national team, won the general classificationl.

March – April
In March, in the Omloop het Nieuwsblad, Ellen van Dijk rode solo to the leader in the race Loes Gunnewijk. Van Dijk lost the sprint from her and finished second. Worrack won the bunch sprint behind them. At the same time Ina-Yoko Teutenberg won the Merco Cycling Classic in the United States. A few days later, Chloe Hosking wins sprint of the Drentse 8 beating Marianne Vos and Giorgia Bronzini. In Argentina the day afterwards, Amber Neben won the time trial at the Pan American Championship which was an important step towards the Olympics.

In the Ronde van Drenthe the team did not play an important role, except for Trixi Worrack who finished fifth. Rowney won a stage in the Redlands Bicycle Classic. In the second world cup race Trofeo Alfredo Binda Evelyn Stevens chased successfully Marianne Vos, but did not see a bend and fell off her bike. Worrack finished third. In the Tour of Flanders Stevens escaped with Andrea Dvorak on the Kruisberg, but at the foot of the old Kwaremont, two former members of the team, Judith Arndt and Kristin Armstrong were able to pull them back and rode away in the ascent. Ultimately Ellen van Dijk took the sixth place in the sprint of the chasing group.

The team rode very well in the Energiewacht Tour. Clara Hughes finished second in the first stage, an individual time trial. Ina Teutenberg won the second and third stage and the team won stage 4a, a team time trial. Overall Teutenberg won the general classification with Ellen van Dijk in second place. In mid April Hosking won in a sprint Halle-Buizingen.

Evelyn Stevens booked the first major victory of the season in the Fleche Wallone World Cup race. She beat Marianne Vos on the line who won the four previous World Cup races. She took profit of the strategy of her team. Clara Huges was in an early breakaway and the Rabobank Women Cycling Team  had to chase her. On the last climb, on top of the Mur de Hoy, Stevens was able to beat Vos.

End of April – May
Ellen van Dijk won the time trial of the Omloop van Borsele, Hughes finished third and Teutenberg fourth. The day afterwards Van Dijk won also the road race of the Omloop van Borsele. At the Gracia–Orlová the team showed again its superiority in the time trial. Ellen van Dijk won the prologue, with Trixi Worrack, Evelyn Stevens and Katie Colclough finishing second, fourth and sixth. Two days later Van Dijk also won the time trial, two seconds ahead of Stevens. The team dominated the stage race and won all the stages, and Ellen van Dijk won the general classification. At the time trial of the Chrono Gatineau the team had a podium sweep. Hughes won ahead of Stevens and Neben and Teutenberg took the fifth place. Teutenberg later on won the road race in Gatineau.

The fifth World Cup Race, the Tour of Chongming Island, ended like the other years in a bunch sprint where Hosking finished fourth. The team performed really well in The Exergy Tour. Amber Neben won the second stage, an individual time trial and Teutenberg the queen stage. Neben, Stevens and Hughes finished first, second and third in the general classification and besides of that the team won the points, mountain and team classification.

The team was really confident with the results in the first half of the season.

June

Ina Teutenberg won the sprint of the first stage of the Emakumeen Euskal Bira.

At the national championships, Ellen van Dijk won the 2012 Dutch Time Trial Championships and Clara Hughes won the title in Canada. In Germany Worrack, Teutenberg and Becker finished respectively second, third and fourth at the German time trial championships behind winner Judith Arndt. In the road race Becker finished second and Worrack third over twelve minutes behind Arndt. Finally in the United States, Amber Neben won the time trial one second ahead of teammate Evelyn Stevens. So they switched positions compared to the 2011 edition.

July
Evelyn Stevens won the third stage of the Giro d'Italia Femminile, and took the pink leaders jersey. However, Marianne Vos dominated the stage race by winning five stages and the general classification. Stevens was second in the general classification until the last stage. Due to a mistake she lost some time and finished in the end third behind Emma Pooley.

Teutenberg won the first two stages of the Thüringen Rundfahrt der Frauen. Trixi Worrack won the third and fourth stage. The one second margin in the time trial of stage 4 between Worrack and Arndt was not enough to win the overall classification and so Worrack finished second overall.

Olympic Games (end July, begin August)

Eight members of the team participated at the 2012 Summer Olympics : Chloe Hosking, Clara Hughes, Ina Teutenberg, Trixi Worrack, Ellen van Dijk, Emilia Fahlin, Amber Neben and Evelyn Stevens.
They participated in the individual time trial and the road race with their national selection. Ellen van Dijk also participated on the track. In the time trial, Clara Hughes finished 5th, Amber Neben 7th, Ellen van Dijk 8th and Trixi Worrack 9th. In the road race Ina Teutenberg won the bunchsprint and finished in 4th place. Ellen van Dijk helped Marianne Vos winning the gold medal and attacked multiple times during the race. Evelyn Stevens also attacked once during the race. Ellen van Dijk participated on the track in the team pursuit. She rode with the Dutch team a national record in the first round and finished in 6th place.

August
Hosking won the fifth stage of La Route de France and Rowney the sixth. The day afterwards Evelyn Stevens won with a large margin on the Planche des Belles Filles and took the leaders jersey. She also won the ninth stage and the overall general classification.

At the Open de Suede Vårgårda TTT world cup race,  won the team time trial with the squad: Stevens, Teutenberg, Worrack, Neben, van Dijk and Becker. In the road race of the Open de Suède Vårgårda, Trixi Worrack finished fifth.

At the end of August Ellen van Dijk won the last stage in Geraardsbergen  and the general classification of the Lotto–Decca Tour, also known as the Tour of Belgium. Stevens finishes fifth in the world cup race GP de Plouay.

September: Holland Ladies Tour and World Championships

Two weeks before the 2012 UCI Road World Championships the team won the team time trial stage of the Holland Ladies Tour with the squad: Van Dijk, Becker, Stevens, Worrack and Teutenberg. Worrack also won a stage in the same tour a few days afterwards.

The team won the team time trial at the World Championships with a 24 seconds gap over Green-Edge with Judith Arndt and Linda Villumsen who were part of the team for two years. The sqad  of the team was: Neben, Stevens, Van Dijk, Becker, Worrack and Teutenberg. And so the team was undefeated in the Team Time Trial in 2012.
At the individual time trial at the World Championships, Evelyn Stevens won the silver medal, Ellen van Dijk finished in fifth place, Teutenberg finished sixth, Neben seventh and Worrack eighth. The team was less successful in the road race at the World Championships. Ellen van Dijk was involved in a large crash. After cycling a few laps on her own, she could not reach the bunch again and had to abandon the race. Amber Neben was the most successful rider finishing in fourth place. All the other riders finished somewhere in the back.

Results

Season victories

Results in major races

Single day races
At the 2012 UCI Women's Road World Cup, Evelyn Stevens finished 3rd in the final classification and Trixi Worrack 4th. The team finished 3rd in the teams standing.

Grand Tours

Other achievements

Dutch national record, team pursuit

Ellen van Dijk, as part of the national team, broke together with Kirsten Wild and Vera Koedooder the Dutch team pursuit record at the 2012 Summer Olympics.

UCI World Ranking

The team finished second in the UCI ranking for teams.

References

2012 UCI Women's Teams seasons
2012 in American sports
2012 in German sport
2012 in women's road cycling
Velocio–SRAM Pro Cycling